The 1992 season was FC Kremin Kremenchuk's 1st season in the Ukrainian Premier League.

Ukrainian Premier League

Kremin's first season in Premier League began on 9 March 1992 and ends on 17 June 1992.

League table

Results summary

Results by round

Ukrainian Cup

First preliminary round

Second preliminary round

Round of 16

Disciplinary record

References

External links
  FC Kremin Kremenchuk official website
  

1992
Kremin Kremenchuk